Tiwi is a small settlement and beach resort in Kenya. The area is served by Ukunda Airport, and is on the A14 road. Matatus to Diani serve the area, via the Likoni Ferry and Mombasa Island. Mostly occupied by the Digo community of the Mijikenda—SHABAN KAHINDI

Tiwi is located in Matuga Constituency of Kwale County.

See also
Historic Swahili Settlements
Swahili architecture

References 

Swahili people
Swahili city-states
Swahili culture
Populated places in Coast Province
Mombasa
Beaches of Kenya